Jorge Luiz Barbieri (born May 1, 1979), or simply Barbieri, is a Brazilian footballer who plays as an offensive midfielder. His previous clubs include ADAP, Ulsan Hyundai in South Korea, Santo André, Cianorte, Marília, Figueirense, Etti Jundiaí, São Paulo FC, Vitória and Ceará.

References

External links
 

1979 births
Brazilian footballers
Brazilian expatriate footballers
Association football midfielders
Living people
Esporte Clube Vitória players
São Paulo FC players
Figueirense FC players
Marília Atlético Clube players
Esporte Clube Santo André players
Ceará Sporting Club players
Ulsan Hyundai FC players
K League 1 players
Expatriate footballers in South Korea
Brazilian expatriate sportspeople in South Korea